Jean Edith Camilla Läckberg Eriksson (born August 30, 1974) is a Swedish crime writer. As of the early-2010s, her work has been translated into more than 40 languages in 60 countries. She has been called "the rock star of Nordic noir."

Writing technique
Läckberg considers herself a crime writing specialist since discovering such literature on her father's bookshelf at a young age. It has remained a fascination for her ever since. Läckberg's books have received special praise for detail and "in-depth characterization". Läckberg – sometimes called the Swedish Agatha Christie – became a writer after her husband and parents enrolled her in a creative writing course as a Christmas present. She describes herself as a visual writer: "For me actually, specific images – snapshots – come first, and then the story starts to come together from those bits and pieces. I am very visual when I write, I 'see' the story in pictures and writing a book is like having a movie running in my head 24/7." Her work has been described as standing "out for its atmospheric depiction of the Swedish coast, well-drawn characters and (at its best) complex and psychologically nuanced plots." In a review of her novel The Preacher (2012) by The Washington Post, the reviewer noted that the "clever plot and in-depth characterization aren’t the only qualities that elevate “The Preacher” above most other thrillers. There’s also an admirable feel for detail." In reviewing her most recent novel (The Golden Cage, 2020), The New York Times described it as a "smart, unflinching novel."

Personal life and entrepreneurial ventures  
Läckberg was born in Fjällbacka, Bohuslän, and started writing at an early age. Her first published work was called "Tomten". After graduating from Gothenburg University with a degree in Economics, she moved to Stockholm, where she worked as an economist before beginning writing fiction seriously. She is a business partner in a jewellery company called Sahara Silver Jewelry AB. Hong Kong maternity fashion company Sono Vaso launched in Europe with the then-pregnant author endorsing.    
     
Läckberg first married Micke Eriksson; they divorced in 2007. Under Swedish law, as Läckberg's ex-husband, Eriksson was entitled to half the revenue from the contracts signed during their marriage. Eventually it was agreed that she would pay him a lump sum.

Läckberg was married for the second time in 2010, to Martin Melin, winner of Expedition Robinson. The two had met at a 2005 release party for one of her books, then began a working relationship. Melin proposed to Läckberg in August 2009.

In 2015, she was engaged to Simon Sköld, MMA fighter and author, and they married in 2017.

Camilla Läckberg has four children: Wille and Meja from her first marriage, Charlie from her second, and Polly is from her relationship with Sköld. Charlie is also the subject of his mother's first children's book, Super-Charlie.

Bibliography 
Most of Läckberg's novels feature the crime solving husband-and-wife duo of writer Erica Falck, and police detective Patrik Hedström.

 2003's Isprinsessan, translated into English as The Ice Princess by Steven T. Murray in 2008. First in the Patrik Hedström and Erica Falck series.
 2004's Predikanten, translated into English as  The Preacher by Steven T. Murray in 2009. Patrik Hedström and Erica Falck #2.
 2005's Stenhuggaren, translated into English as The Stone Cutter by  Steven T. Murray in 2008. Patrik Hedström and Erica Falck #3.
 2006's Olycksfågeln, translated into English as The Gallows Bird a.k.a. The Stranger by Steven T. Murray in 2011. The paperback version seems to be called The Stranger; the film is called The Jinx. Patrik Hedström and Erica Falck #4.
 2007's Tyskungen, translated into English as The Hidden Child by Tiina Nunnally in 2011. Patrik Hedström and Erica Falck #5.
 Also published in 2007 was Snöstorm och mandeldoft, a novella translated into English as The Scent of Almonds; included in 2013's Mord och mandeldoft.
 2008's Sjöjungfrun, translated into English as The Drowning by Tiina Nunnally in 2012. Patrik Hedström and Erica Falck #6.
 Läckberg also published in 2008 Smaker från Fjällbacka, a cookbook that was translated into English as Flavours from Fjällbacka.
 2009's Fyrvaktaren, translated into English as The Lost Boy by Tiina Nunnally in 2013. Patrik Hedström and Erica Falck #7.
 2011's Änglamakerskan, translated into English as  The Angel Maker's Wife, a.k.a. Buried Angels, by Tiina Nunnally in 2014. Patrik Hedström and Erica Falck #8.
 2011 also saw Fest, mat och kärlek translated into English as Feast, Food & Love.
 Also published in 2011 was Super Charlie, translated into English as Super Charlie. Subject of the book is Läckberg's son Charlie.
 2013's Mord och mandeldoft, translated into English as  The Scent of Almonds and Other Stories by Tiina Nunnally in 2015.
 2014's Lejontämjaren, translated into English as The Ice Child by Tiina Nunnally in 2016. Patrik Hedström and Erica Falck #9.
 2017's Häxan, translated into English as The Girl in the Woods. Patrik Hedström and Erica Falck #10.
 2019 The Golden Cage
 2020 Silver Tears

Adaptations

Television
The first four novels were adapted as telemovies between 2007 and 2010, with Elisabet Carlsson and Niklas Hjulström starring as Erica and Patrik.
 
Filming of the TV series Fjällbackamorden began in August 2011 based on the characters from Läckberg's novels, but the stories were new, with actors Claudia Galli and Richard Ulfsäter playing Erica and Patrik.

Film
In 2013, a Swedish film directed by Per Hanefjord titled Tyskungen, and based on Lackberg's 2007's novel of the same name (translated into English as The Hidden Child) was released with 
Galli and Ulfsäter reprising their roles as Erica and Patrik.

Awards
 People's Literature Award (2006)
 SKTF Prize for Author of the Year (2005)
 Grand Prix de Littérature Policière (2008)

See also
List of female detective/mystery writers
List of women writers
Swedish Crime Writers' Academy

References

External links

Official Website (in English)
Camilla Läckberg's top 10 Swedish crime novels
Official Blog (in Swedish)
Camilla Lackberg in BCNegra

1974 births
Living people
People from Tanum Municipality
Writers from Bohuslän
Swedish crime fiction writers
Swedish women novelists
Swedish mystery writers
Women mystery writers
Women crime fiction writers
21st-century Swedish women writers
21st-century Swedish novelists
University of Gothenburg alumni
Nordic Noir writers